Macrobathra drosera is a moth in the family Cosmopterigidae. It was described by Oswald Bertram Lower in 1901. It is found in Australia, where it has been recorded from Queensland.

References

Macrobathra
Moths described in 1901